Puti Shushen  is a goddess who guards the Bodhi Tree, specifically the same tree under which the Buddha attained enlightenment. She is an important deity in Chinese Buddhism and considered its earliest protector.

Legend
According to tradition, under the Bodhi Tree the Buddha observed the twelve causes and conditions of achieving enlightenment. "Bodhi" means "enlightenment and wisdom". In some Buddhist stories, gods near the Bodhi Tree joyfully offered themselves in service to the Buddha. After the image of the Bodhi Tree guarding the Buddha became personified, it, instead, was seen as the Bodhi Tree god.

In Chinese Buddhism, the guardian of the Bodhi tree is called Puti Shushen. She is regarded as one of the Sixteen Devas (十六諸天 Shíliù Zhūtiān), the Twenty Devas (二十諸天 Èrshí Zhūtiān) and the Twenty-Four Devas (二十四諸天 Èrshísì zhūtiān). In Buddhist temples she is represented as holding a branch in her hands and dressing as a young woman.

References 

Chinese goddesses
Buddhist goddesses
Tree goddesses
Twenty-Four Protective Deities